Hymns Just for You is the eighth album by Christian/Gospel singer Sandi Patti. Released in 1985, it would be her final album on the Benson label. It is an album of hymns with five of the track done in medleys covering a selection of songs that people have sung in churches. The album peaked at No. 2 on the Billboard Top Christian Albums chart. Patti was nominated for Best Gospel Performance, Female at the 28th Annual Grammy Awards in 1986. The album was certified Gold in 1986 and Platinum in 1989 by the Recording Industry Association of America for sales of over one million copies. In 1990, Hymns Just for You was re-issued on Word Records.

Track listing

Personnel 
 Sandi Patti – vocals 
 David Huntsinger – acoustic piano 
 Rex Thomas – guitars 
 Steve Dokken – bass
 Mark Hammond – drums 
 Farrell Morris – percussion (2, 4, 6, 8, 9, 10)
 David T. Clydesdale – orchestra arrangements and conductor (1, 3, 5, 7)
 Alan Moore – orchestra arrangements and conductor (2, 4, 6, 8, 9, 10)
Backing vocals 
 Jim Bittner, Tammy Boyer, Cozette Byrd, Beverly Darnall, John Darnall, Lisa DeHaan, Brian Felter, Sharon Felter, Greg McCaw, Greg Meyer, Sandi Patti Helvering, Craig Patty, Mike Patty, Dwight Robertson, Melodie Tunney and Carol Vader

Production
 John L. Helvering – executive producer 
 Greg Nelson – producer 
 Sandi Patti – producer 
 John Bolt – chief engineer 
 Mark Aspinall – assistant engineer (1, 3, 5, 7)
 Steve Archer – assistant engineer (1, 3, 5, 7)
 Kevin Thompson – assistant engineer (2, 4, 6, 8, 9, 10)
 David T. Clydesdale – production assistance
 Kent Hunter – cover design 
 Thomas Ryan Design – cover design
 Larry Williams – photography 
 The Helvering Agency – management

Charts

Radio singles

Accolades
GMA Dove Awards
1986 Female Vocalist of the Year

Certifications and sales

References

1985 albums
Sandi Patty albums